St. Matthew is a marble sculpture by Michelangelo which depicts Matthew the Apostle. The sculpture was intended for a series of twelve apostles for the choir niches of the Florence Cathedral but left unfinished in 1506 when Michelangelo moved to Rome to work for Pope Julius II. It is currently part of the collection of the Galleria dell'Accademia in Florence.

See also
List of works by Michelangelo

External links
 http://www.polomuseale.firenze.it/catalogo/scheda.asp?nctn=00281985&value=1
 

1506 works
16th-century sculptures
Sculptures of the Galleria dell'Accademia
Marble sculptures in Italy
Matthew the Apostle
Sculptures by Michelangelo
Sculptures depicting New Testament people
Statues of apostles
Unfinished sculptures